"Kilimanjaro" is a Tamil song from the 2010 film Enthiran, directed by S. Shankar. The song was composed by A. R. Rahman, lyrics penned by Pa.Vijay and sung by Javed Ali and Chinmayi. The Hindi and Telugu version of the song has lyrics respectively written by Swanand Kirkire and Bhuvana Chandra. The song, based on the raga Karaharapriya, is reputed for its use of tribal beats with a catchy chorus and with various musical experiments. Song shooting took place in Machu Picchu in Peru. The song was released in Hindi and Telugu  under the same name.

Music structure and lyrics
The song has been composed on raga Karaharapriya. The song features African tribal percussions created by multiple Octapads and vocals, which well suits the song situation. It is sung by noted duo Javed Ali and Chinmayi in all three versions. Singer Chinmayi, who worked with the trio (Rahman, Sankar and Rajinikanth) in the song "Sahana", said it was "a Dream Come True" to sing again for Rajinikanth. The additional vocal arrangements of the song is done by Clinton Cerejo.

The original title of the song is retained in all three versions. The words "Kilimanjaro", "Mohenjo-Daro" etc., originally included by Pa. Vijay,  appears in all the versions.

Release and reception
The song was released as part of the soundtrack album of the film on 31 July 2010. The song topped the country charts, holding the #1 position for many continuous weeks. It topped Tamil film music charts for over five months.

The audio along with the entire soundtrack, broke several records in the Indian music industry, testified by its chart positions and digital downloads. It is often praised to be having the "usual Rahman touch".

Music video 
The song is picturised on Rajinikanth and Aishwarya Rai singing a duet with a host of tribal dancers in the background and prompts laughter and humour due to the funny costumes and cinematography of the song. The song sequence was filmed at Machu Picchu in Peru, making it the first Indian video to be picturised on the protected heritage site. According to official sources, there were interventions from the Indian government to grant permission for the shooting, which was denied even for many international projects like Quantum of Solace. It was choreographed by Raju Sundaram, brother of Prabhudeva, who choreographed many other songs in the film.

It was the most expensive Indian music video up until then, costing , equivalent to  adjusted for inflation.

Other versions 
The film is parodied in the film Oru Kal Oru Kannadi (2012) in the song "Kaadhal Oru" with Udhayanidhi Stalin and Hansika Motwani. In the Telugu film Nuvva Nena, the song is parodied with Brahmanandam and Kovai Sarala.

Awards and nominations

Won

 2010: Mirchi Music Award for Best Female Playback Singer - Tamil - Chinmayi
 2010: CSK Academy Of Motion Picture Arts & Science Award for Best Female Playback Singer - Chinmayi
 2010: MGR Sivaji Academy Award for Best Female Playback Singer - Chinmayi
 2010: Vijay Music Award for Popular Female Playback Singer - Chinmayi
 2010: Vijay Music Award for Popular Song of the year
 2010: Tamil Nadu State Film Award for Best Female Playback - Chinmayi

Nominations

 2010: Filmfare Award for Best Female Playback Singer – Tamil - Chinmayi
 2010: Vijay Award for Best Female Playback Singer - Chinmayi

References

External links

2010 songs
Indian songs
Songs about Africa
Songs about mountains
Songs with music by A. R. Rahman
Tamil-language songs
Tamil film songs
Songs written for films
Enthiran
Telugu film songs